Doxapatres (anglicized Doxapater) is Byzantine family name. The forms Δοξόπατρος, Doxopatros, Doxopatres and Doxopater are erroneous.

Persons with this name include;
Gregory Doxapatres (11th century), commentator on the Basilika
John Doxapatres (11th century), rhetorician and commentator
Nicholas Doxapatres (12th century), canonist, possibly identical with Neilos
Neilos Doxapatres (12th century), Siculo-Greek monk and writer, possibly identical with Nicholas
Doxapatres Boutsaras (13th century)

References

Byzantine families
Greek-language surnames

ca:Doxapater